The Stevenson Railroad Depot and Hotel station are a historic train station and hotel in Stevenson, Alabama.  They were built circa 1872 as a joint project of the Memphis and Charleston Railroad and the Nashville and Chattanooga Railroad, whose lines converged in Stevenson.  When the Memphis & Charleston was purchased by the Southern Railway in 1898, the Louisville and Nashville Railroad (who had taken over the N&C in 1880) took sole control of the depot and operated it until 1976.  It was converted into a history museum in 1982.  Both buildings are brick with gable roofs and Italianate details.  The depot has a central, second-story tower that was added in 1887.  The three-story hotel had a lobby, dining room, and kitchen on the first floor and eight large guest rooms on the upper floors.  The buildings were listed on the Alabama Register of Landmarks and Heritage in 1975 and the National Register of Historic Places in 1976.

The building is now operated as the Stevenson Railroad Depot Museum and features area railroad and Civil War artifacts.

References

External links
 Stevenson Railroad Depot Museum - City of Stevenson
 Stevenson Depot Days

National Register of Historic Places in Jackson County, Alabama
Railway stations on the National Register of Historic Places in Alabama
Italianate architecture in Alabama
Hotel buildings completed in 1872
Railway stations in the United States opened in 1872
Transportation buildings and structures in Jackson County, Alabama
Hotel buildings on the National Register of Historic Places in Alabama
History museums in Alabama
Museums in Jackson County, Alabama
Properties on the Alabama Register of Landmarks and Heritage
1872 establishments in Alabama
Former Louisville and Nashville Railroad stations
Former railway stations in Alabama